"All Too Well" is a song by American singer-songwriter Taylor Swift. She wrote the song with Liz Rose and first released it as part of her fourth studio album, Red (2012). Produced by Swift and Nathan Chapman, "All Too Well" is a slow-burning power ballad combining styles of country, folk, and rock music. The lyrics narrate a derailed romantic relationship using expository details and specific, vivid imagery. After Red October 2012 release through Big Machine Records, "All Too Well" peaked at lower-tier positions on the US Billboard Hot 100 and Canadian Hot 100 charts, and was certified gold by the Recording Industry Association of America (RIAA).

Swift performed the track at the 56th Annual Grammy Awards in January 2014, included it in the set list to the Red Tour (2013–14), and in the set lists for select shows of her other concerts. "All Too Well" went on to earn a cult following, with its "scarf" reference becoming a popular culture phenomenon. Music critics universally hailed "All Too Well" as Swift's best song, with particular praise for its evocative emotion and detail-heavy lyricism. The track featured on several publications' best-of lists, such as Rolling Stone 2021 revision of the 500 Greatest Songs of All Time (number 69).

Following the controversy regarding her masters, Swift re-recorded "All Too Well" and the unabridged "10 Minute Version" for Red re-recording, Red (Taylor's Version) (2021), released via Republic Records. Produced by Swift and Jack Antonoff, the 10-minute version incorporates an atmospheric pop rock production and contains the trimmed parts from the original 2012 release. "All Too Well (10 Minute Version)" topped charts worldwide and became the longest song to reach number one on the Billboard Hot 100. Critics received the 10-minute version with rave reviews: they praised the song structure and richer context to an existing acclaimed song, featured it in many year-end lists, and dubbed it a career highlight. It received a Grammy nomination for Song of the Year. Its accompanying short film, directed by Swift, won an MTV Video Music Award for Video of the Year and a Grammy Award for Best Music Video.

2012 version

Background and release 

"All Too Well" was the first song Swift wrote for her album Red, having penned the lyrics almost two years before the album's release. While collaborating with different writers on Red, Swift wrote the song along with Liz Rose, with whom she had written many songs on her earlier albums. Rose has said that Swift unexpectedly asked her to help write the song as a one-off project after not having collaborated with Swift for some years. Swift wrote a first draft of the song by herself unexpectedly while on her Speak Now World Tour in February 2011, with the final draft being completed in March of that same year.

In an interview with Good Morning America, Swift said that the song was "the hardest to write on the album", saying: "it took me a really long time to filter through everything I wanted to put in the song without it being a 10-minute song, which you can't put on an album. I wanted a story that could work in the form of a song and I called my co-writer Liz Rose and said, 'Come over, we've gotta filter this down,' and it took me a really long time to get it." Rose also said that the song was originally "10, 12 or 15 minutes long" before cutting down to "the important pieces". In a later interview, Rose described "All Too Well" as originally being "probably a 20-minute song when [Swift] called me." Even after cutting it down, the song is the longest track on the album, clocking in at five minutes and twenty-eight seconds (5:28). In a 2020 interview on Rolling Stone's 500 Greatest Albums podcast, Swift later confirmed that the original version was about 10 minutes long and also revealed that it was explicit. The song's studio recording was produced by Swift and Nathan Chapman.

In an interview with Rolling Stone, Liz Rose explained how "All Too Well" came to be, stating "When we did 'All Too Well,' I hadn't heard from her in awhile. She hadn't really been writing." After receiving a call from Swift asking her to collaborate on the song, Rose explained that "[Swift] had a ''lot'' of information. I just let her go. She already had a melody and she started singing some words, and I started writing things down, saying, 'Ok, let's use this, let's use that." Rose later stated "It was the most emotional, in-depth song we've ever written."

The song's secret message in Red's liner notes is "MAPLE LATTES". The first of four Target-exclusive deluxe editions of Swift's 2019 album Lover contained her old diary, in which some of the scrapped lyrics of "All Too Well" can be found: "There we are again / You're crying on the phone / Realized you lost the one real thing you've ever known" was the original bridge of the song, while the original opening lines were "I walked through the door with you / The air was cold / Pictures on the fireplace, you're showing me around." Additional original lyrics included "There we are again / When you blew the candle out / Took this blazing love and steered it right into the ground / Running scared, I was there," and "You'll mail back my things in a box with no note / Except for that scarf from the very first week / Yeah you keep it in your drawer 'cause it smells like me."

Following a dispute with Scooter Braun and Big Machine Records over the rights to the masters of her first six studio albums, including Red, Swift announced her intention to re-record each of the albums under her new label, Republic Records. On June 18, 2021, Swift announced that Red (Taylor's Version) would be released on November 12, 2021. In the social media post announcing the album, she wrote, "This will be the first time you hear all 30 songs that were meant to go on Red. And hey, one of them is even ten minutes long," driving widespread speculation that the extended 10-minute version of "All Too Well" would be included on Red (Taylor's Version), which was confirmed by Swift when she revealed the tracklist on August 6, 2021.

Composition and lyrics 
"All Too Well" is a power ballad. It combines country, country rock, arena rock, folk, power pop, and soft rock. Its lyrics narrate the difficulty of moving on from a crushing heartbreak. It runs for five minutes and twenty-eight seconds, making it the longest track on the album. Musically, the song is set in the key of C major with a tempo of 93 beats per minute. Swift's vocals range from F3 to D5. The song is instrumented by acoustic and electric guitars, keyboard, drums, and bass. The song follows the track five pattern noted by music critics, in which the fifth track on Swift's albums are the most "anguish-filled" songs, featuring "stabbing lyrics and climactic bridges." The song is often categorized as Red's emotional centerpiece by critics. Brad Nelson of Pitchfork identified the song as the climax of Red's overarching theme that "Nothing dies without leaving some trace of itself."

The lyrics see Swift long for the memories of the relationship that have been frozen in time. Swift sings "I can picture it after all these days," "Time won't fly / It's like I'm paralyzed by it," and "I remember it all too well." The verses narrate expository details. Rebecca Farley of Refinery29 described the lyrics as blameless, lamenting the negative space left by a breakup and recounting the lost memories. Brittany Spanos of Rolling Stone writes that the song describes "the pain of having to piece one's self back together again" after a relationship ends. The song crescendos from a slow, folk-inspired intro to an arena rock bridge, where Swift sings "And you call me up again just to break me like a promise / So casually cruel in the name of being honest / I'm a crumpled up piece of paper lying here / 'Cause I remember it all, all, all / Too well." The events are set mainly in autumn, with Swift singing "Autumn leaves falling down like pieces into place / And I can picture it after all these days" in the first verse. Ginny Montalbano of the University of Texas at Austin's Country Music Project highlighted the song's unique structure Swift used to accommodate the song's dramatic details.

The song opens with the lyric "I walked through the door with you / the air was cold / but something about it felt like home somehow / and I left my scarf there at your sister's house / and you've still got it in your drawer even now." The scarf is mentioned again towards the end of the song: "But you keep my old scarf from that very first week / 'Cause it reminds you of innocence and it smells like me / You can't get rid of it 'cause you remember it all too well." Nelson compared the scarf to a Chekhov's gun, symbolizing the persisting emotional flame of their romance long after it has physically ended.

Critical reception 
"All Too Well" has received widespread acclaim from critics, who have lauded it as one of Swift's best-written songs for its heavily detailed and powerful lyrics. Rob Sheffield of Rolling Stone ranked it as Swift's greatest song, and wrote that Swift "[spins] a tragic tale of doomed love and scarves and autumn leaves and maple lattes." Brittany Spanos also of Rolling Stone wrote that the song is a "masterpiece of the break-up ballad form". In a track-by-track review of Red, Billboard described the song as a "sumptuous country" track that sees Swift mourn the memories "of a romance that has seemingly been buried in time." Writing for Slant Magazine, Jonathan Keefe chose "All Too Well" as "arguably the finest song in Swift's entire catalogue:" it "crescendos from coffeehouse folk to arena rock [...] until she unleashes one of her best-ever lines [...] and the song explodes into a full-on bloodletting."

In Sam Lansky's review of Red published in Idolator, he stated that of all of the songs on Red, "All Too Well" "hits the hardest... reaching an almost hysterical unraveling." In a ranking of her discography (127 songs at the time of publication), Nate Jones of Vulture ranked "All Too Well" as her second-best song, praising its "string of impeccably observed details" and describing the song as a "kaleidoscopic swirl of images", choosing it as one of her most memorable songs. J. English of NPR praised its maturity compared to her earlier work, writing that Swift "mourns the loss of her innocence" while simultaneously acknowledging her naïveté as she comes of age. In a review of Red, John Dolan of Rolling Stone remarked on the song's imagery, especially in the lyric "We're dancing 'round the kitchen in the refrigerator light", while Michael Robbins of Spin described that same lyric as "gorgeous". Jon Caramanica, writing for The New York Times hailed the petulance of her shouts, resulting in a song that "swells until it erupts."

Commercial performance 
The week her album Red was released, all of the songs charted in different countries due to strong digital sale downloads. On the issue date November 10, 2012, "All Too Well" debuted at number 80 on the Billboard Hot 100, number 22 on the Digital Song Sales chart, number 59 on the Canadian Hot 100, and number 17 on the Hot Country Songs chart. On July 23, 2018, "All Too Well" was certified Gold by the Recording Industry Association of America for selling over 500,000 units in the country.

Charts

Certifications

2021 re-recordings

Background and release 
After a public dispute over the ownership of Swift's back catalog under her previous label Big Machine, Swift began re-recording her entire back catalog in November 2020 to claim the rights to her master recordings. After her first re-recorded album, Fearless (Taylor's Version)—the re-recording of her 2008 album, Swift followed with Red (Taylor's Version)—the re-recording of her 2012 album. Red (Taylor's Version), released on November 12, 2021, features two versions of "All Too Well": a re-recording of the original one subtitled "Taylor's Version", and a 10-minute version subtitled "10 Minute Version (Taylor's Version) (From the Vault)".

Before "All Too Well" was cut down to a 10-minute version and then more to a final five minute and 28-second version, American songwriter Liz Rose, with whom Swift wrote the song, believed it was "probably a 20-minute song". Swift had conceived the song in February 2011 while at a band rehearsal for the Speak Now World Tour.
In promoting the single's release, Swift appeared on The Tonight Show Starring Jimmy Fallon on November 11, 2021, the day before the album's release. During the interview, while discussing where the origins of "All Too Well" came from, Swift recalled ad-libbing the song at a band rehearsal when she was 21, and at the end of the session, her mother approached the sound guy and collected a CD of the recorded session.

"All Too Well (Taylor's Version)" was made available to US hot adult contemporary on November 11, 2021, one day before the release of Red (Taylor's Version). "All Too Well (10 Minute Version)" was released as a digital promotional single on Swift's webstore on November 15, 2021, exclusively to U.S. customers. The live acoustic version from the All Too Well: The Short Film premiere performance was released to the iTunes Store and her website for digital download the same day. The acoustic "Sad Girl Autumn" version, recorded at Aaron Dessner's Long Pond Studio in Hudson Valley, was released on November 17. In June 2022, a new version titled "All Too Well (10 Minute Version) (The Short Film)" was released for digital download and streaming that is 11 minutes and 26 seconds long with different instrumentals and outro. The 10-minute version of the song was included on the set list for the Eras Tour (2023).

Lyrics 

Memories are the building blocks of "All Too Well". The song relies on specifics of the rise and fall of a romantic relationship, drawn from memory. Apart from mentioning more expository details, "All Too Well (10 Minute Version)" provides greater context than the five-minute version; Swift mentions the age difference between her and the subject several times, and states how the subject used it as an excuse to terminate their relationship but continued to date women of her age. She recollects "the build-up and intensity of falling in love" and acknowledges her naivety. The production of the first verse is relatively more uptempo, with new lyrics added such as "And you were tossing me the car keys / 'Fuck the patriarchy' keychain on the ground." Apart from the unaltered bridge, the differences of "All Too Well (10 Minute Version)" from the 5-minute version in song structure are an elaborate third verse, an extended chorus, two more verses after the bridge, an outro, and the absence of the male backing vocals, replaced with Swift's own backing vocals. The 10-minute version features an atmospheric, contemplative pop rock production, replacing the original's acoustic, arena-friendly arrangement.

Critical reception 
"All Too Well (10 Minute Version)" was met with universal critical acclaim, often hailed as the standout track on Red (Taylor's Version) and a career highlight for Swift. Rolling Stone music critic Rob Sheffield lauded the 10-minute version for evoking even more intense emotions than the already sentimental five-minute song: "[It] sums up Swift at her absolute best." Helen Brown of The Independent stated the song is a more feminist proposition with its new lyrics. NME Hannah Mylrea wrote, at its full intended length, "All Too Well (10 Minute Version)" confirms its place as an "epic", exhibiting proficient storytelling, vocal performance and instrumentation. Beth Kirkbride, writing for Clash, said the "epic" song "will go down in history as one of the best breakup songs ever written." Kate Solomon of i wrote the pain "feels raw" in Swift's voice.

Variety Chris Willman dubbed the song as Swift's "holy grail", and felt glad the singer did not discard the original lyrics, which turn the song into "a stream-of-consciousness epic ballad", filled with more references and specifics of the song's storyline. Reviewing for The Line of Best Fit, Paul Bridgewater opined the 10 minute version is "as disarming as it is fascinating"—"an artefact of [Swift's] songwriting and recording process." He asserted that the song magnifies the truncated version's drama and emotion. Slant Magazine critic Jonathan Keefe stated, while the 5-minute version solely focuses on catharsis from a painful relationship, the 10-minute version "more openly implicates the ex who's responsible for causing that pain", and changes the overall tone of "All Too Well" with its new verses and song structure.

Bobby Olivier of Spin praised the song as "Swift's single finest piece of songwriting". Melissa Reguieri, in her USA Today review, said the song "lopes through encyclopedic lyrics that both bite and wound in their honesty and pain." Sputnikmusic staff critic wrote "All Too Well (10 Minute Version)" is "not a flashy pop song or an endearingly rural slice of country" but simply a raw depiction of Swift's emotions, and concluded that the "towering breakup ballad" represents Swift's habit of "expressing these commonplace emotions in uniquely uncommon ways" in her writing. Lydia Burgham of The New Zealand Herald said the lyrics "paint a vivid picture of an ill-fated romance that cuts deep and captures the universal language of heartbreak." In the words of The New York Times critic Lindsay Zoladz, the song is "quite poignantly, about a young woman's attempt to find retroactive equilibrium in a relationship that was based on a power imbalance that she was not at first able to perceive."

The Guardian writer Laura Snapes also dubbed the song an epic track, "one that eviscerates her slick ex in a series of ever-more climactic verses that never resolve to a chorus, just a shuddered realisation of how vividly she recalls his disregard." Snapes associated the lyric "soldier who's returning half her weight" with Swift's eating disorder, and interpreted it as a nod to the physical manifestations of heartache. Spencer Kornhaber of The Atlantic wrote that "All Too Well (10 Minute Version)" contains more specificity in its lyrics, exuding "both warm nostalgia and cooling disdain", which "mesmerizes as Swift's cadence slips and slides against the steadily pounding beat", rather than cluttering the song as one would expect. Kornhaber also admired its outro and tempo shift. In a less complimentary review, Olivia Horn from Pitchfork felt the song was too long and sprawling, undermining the emotional climax of "All Too Well" (2012). In agreement, Lindsay Zoladz preferred the five-minute version, but appreciated the 10-minute version for its "unapologetic messiness" with nuanced messages about female emotions and societal relationships.

GQ ranked "All Too Well (10 Minute Version)" as the best single of Swift's career, in October 2022. Alternative Press ranked it as the most emo track in Swift's catalog. The song appeared on several year-end rankings of the best songs of 2021.

Short film 

On November 5, 2021, Swift posted a teaser of a self-directed short film for the 10-minute version, titled All Too Well: The Short Film, based on the premise of the song, and stars Sadie Sink and Dylan O'Brien as a couple in a romantic relationship that ultimately falls apart; Swift also makes a brief appearance. It was released on November 12, 2021, to critical acclaim. The version of the song used in All Too Well: The Short Film was made available to streaming platforms on June 11, 2022, the same day Swift made an appearance at the Tribeca Film Festival to discuss her approach to making the short film.

Accolades

Commercial performance 
"All Too Well (Taylor's Version)" debuted at number one on the Australian ARIA Singles Chart the same week Red (Taylor's Version) topped the Australian ARIA Albums Chart, earning Swift a fourth "Chart Double". It also helped Swift score a "Chart Double" in Ireland, her second number-one song in the country after "Look What You Made Me Do" (2017). The song was Swift's eighth number-one on the Canadian Hot 100, and entered the UK Singles Chart at number three, the longest song to reach the top three in the UK chart history.

On the US Billboard Hot 100, "All Too Well (Taylor's Version)" marked Swift's eighth number-one song. It topped the chart with 54.4 million streams, 57,800 downloads sold, and negligible airplay. The song became the longest number-one song in chart history, surpassing Don McLean's 1972 song "American Pie", a feat recognized in the Guinness World Records. Topping the Billboard Hot 100 the same week Red (Taylor's Version) topped the Billboard 200, it marked Swift's record-extending third time to debut atop both charts the same week. As Swift's 30th top-10 entry, it made her the sixth artist to reach the milestone. It was her fifth song to top Billboard Streaming Songs and 23rd to top Billboard Digital Song Sales charts, extending her record as the female musician with the most chart toppers on both. "All Too Well (Taylor's Version)" is Swift's ninth number-one song on Billboard Hot Country Songs chart, 18th number-one song on Billboard Country Digital Song Sales chart, and sixth number-one song on Billboard Country Streaming Songs chart, confirming her status as the artist with the most number-one songs on the latter two. In addition, the song is the first by a solo female artist to enter the Hot 100 and Hot Country Songs charts at the summit simultaneously.

Don McLean, when asked about his record broken by Swift in a Billboard interview, said "there is something to be said for a great song that has staying power. 'American Pie' remained on top for 50 years and now Taylor Swift has unseated such a historic piece of artistry. Let's face it, nobody ever wants to lose that No. 1 spot, but if I had to lose it to somebody, I sure am glad it was another great singer/songwriter such as Taylor."

Charts

Weekly charts

Year-end charts

Certifications

Release history

Live performances 

On January 26, 2014, Swift performed "All Too Well" at the 56th Annual Grammy Awards in Los Angeles, where Red was nominated for Album of the Year and Best Country Album. Wearing a dramatic beaded gown with sequin detailing and a long train streaming out behind her, she sang while playing piano on a low lit stage, before being joined by a live band midway through the performance. Her performance was praised and received a standing ovation. Swift's headbanging at the song's climax gained significant media coverage. Sean Thomas of The Slanted called it the "performance of the night," and Amy Sciarretto of Pop Crush hailed it as "unforgettable."

Swift also performed the song live throughout her Red Tour, while playing the piano. On August 21, 2015, Swift performed the song in Los Angeles at the Staples Center, the only time on The 1989 World Tour. On February 4, 2017, Swift performed the song as part of the Super Saturday Night show in Houston.

Swift performed an acoustic version of the song on the first show of her Reputation Stadium Tour in Glendale, Arizona on May 8, 2018, the fifth show in Pasadena, California on May 19, 2018, and the last show of the U.S. leg of the tour in Arlington, Texas on October 6, 2018, the latter of which appeared in her Netflix concert film of the same name. On September 10, 2019, Swift performed the song as part of the City of Lover concert. On October 11, 2019, she performed the song at a Tiny Desk Concert for NPR Music.

She performed the 10-minute song after the screening of All Too Well: The Short Film at its film premiere, and on Saturday Night Live the following night. Hits dubbed the SNL performance "one of the most riveting musical moments of the year." She also performed the song at the 2022 Nashville Songwriter Awards.

Impact and legacy 
Often dubbed as Swift's magnum opus, "All Too Well" is hailed by music critics, fans and journalists as the best song in Swift's discography, citing the vivid songwriting that evokes deep emotional engagement. Sheffield commented, "No other song does such a stellar job of showing off her ability to blow up a trivial little detail into a legendary heartache."

Listicles 
The song featured on many publications' lists of the best songs from the 2010s decade, including Rolling Stone (5th), Uproxx (10th), Stereogum (24th), and Pitchfork (57th). It featured in unranked 2010s-decade-end lists by Time and Parade, and at number 13 on NPR's readers' poll for the best songs of the same decade. Sheffield ranked "All Too Well" first on his 2010s-decade-end list. Rolling Stone placed "All Too Well" at number 29 of its 2018 list of the 100 Greatest Songs of the Century So Far, and 69 on its list 2020 revision of the 500 Greatest Songs of All Time. In 2021, Sheffield placed the song at number one on his ranking of 206 Taylor Swift songs. In a list titled "The 25 Musical Moments That Defined the First Quarter of the 2020s", Billboard described "All Too Well (10 Minute Version)" as the "crown jewel" of Red (Taylor’s Version) and one of 2021's "biggest cultural hits". In 2022, Billboard named "All Too Well (10-Minute Version)" the best breakup song of all time.

Recognition 
Critics often regard "All Too Well" as Swift's best song. Billboard stated "All Too Well" is the song that "proved to skeptics who might've thoughtlessly dismissed Swift as a frivolous pop star—in an era when such artists still weren't given nearly as much credit or attention by critics and older music fans as they are now—that she was in fact a truly formidable singer-songwriter." Bruce Warren, assistant general manager for programming for Philadelphia public radio station WXPN, stated that "All Too Well" foreshadowed Swift's music direction for 2020. He said "In 2014 or 2015, you wouldn't have been able to say, '[Taylor Swift] is working with Justin Vernon,' right? ['All Too Well'] foreshadowed the place she's in now... 'All Too Well' showed the potential of how great a songwriter she would be, and how she would evolve as a songwriter. And [Folklore and Evermore] took her to another level." At the 65th Annual Grammy Awards, "All Too Well (10 Minute Version)" lost Song of the Year to Bonnie Raitt's "Just Like That" (2022), garnering controversy over the fact that Swift, who is often considered as one of the foremost songwriters of the 21st-century, has never won Song of the Year despite it being the sixth nomination of her career and "All Too Well" dubbed her best work. In March 2023, Stanford University launched an academic course titled "ITALIC 99: All Too Well (Ten Week Version)"; it is "an in-depth analysis" of the song, recognizing Swift's songwriting prowess and related literature.

Popularity 
"All Too Well" is a fan-favorite. Over time, the song achieved a cult following within Swift's fanbase, as with the critics and other artists as well. Despite not being a single, "All Too Well" is one of Swift's most widely recognized, requested, and covered songs. Swift herself remarked this unexpected popularity during her Reputation Stadium Tour:

Upon announcement of the release of the original, 10-minute version of "All Too Well" as part of Swift's second re-recorded album, Red (Taylor's Version), the extended version became the most anticipated song from the album. The multimedia release of the album, the 10-minute song, and All Too Well: The Short Film has been described as one of the biggest pop culture moments of 2021.

The scarf 
"All Too Well" opens with the lines "I walked through the door with you / the air was cold / but something about it felt like home somehow / and I left my scarf there at your sister's house / and you've still got it in your drawer even now", and contains the lines "But you keep my old scarf from that very first week / 'Cause it reminds you of innocence / And it smells like me / You can't get rid of it / 'Cause you remember it all too well" in its final verse. Over the years, the whereabouts of the scarf referenced in the lyrics have become a subject of media attention and speculation.

According to media outlets, the scarf mentioned in the lyrics was originally lost at the residence of American actress Maggie Gyllenhaal, sister of Jake Gyllenhaal. According to The Cut, it is a "very 2008 Americana chic" dark blue scarf with red and gray stripes. Insider confirmed Gucci as the scarf's brand and that Swift was wearing the scarf when she was taking a stroll in London with both Jake and Maggie Gyllenhaal, as seen in multiple photographs by paparazzi. Brad Nelson wrote in The Atlantic that the scarf is a Chekhov's gun whose reappearance in the final verse is thoughtful and "brutal". He explained the missing scarf quickly became a "fantastic pop culture mystery" that has created much online buzz.

When asked about the scarf in 2017 by American host Andy Cohen, Maggie Gyllenhaal stated she has no idea where the scarf is, and did not understand why people asked her about it until an interviewer explained the lyrics to her. The scarf's existence or its lyrical use as just as a metaphor has been a topic of debate among fans, music critics and pop culture commentators, who "agree it's more than a simple piece of outerwear." According to Sheffield, both the song and the scarf are so significant to Swift's discography that it "should be in the Rock and Roll Hall of Fame." The scarf has become a symbol in Swift's fandom, inspiring jokes, memes, and interview questions. It has even inspired numerous fan-fictions in other fandoms. Writer Kaitlyn Tiffany of The Verge described the scarf as "the green dock light of our time." Insider Callie Ahlgrim called it a "fabled accessory" and "a source of cultural curiosity". NME critic Rhian Daly said the scarf is "an unlikely pop culture icon in an inanimate object". USA Today said the scarf "re-entered the pop culture conversation" after All Too Well: The Short Film. Kate Leaver of The Sydney Morning Herald wrote only Swift "could make a decade-old item of clothing a universal symbol for heartbreak." The Guardian named the song one of "the most debated lyric mysteries ever".

In 2021, following the release of the film and Red (Taylor's Version), the Google searches for "Taylor Swift red scarf meaning" spiked by 1,400 percent. The scarf has been depicted as a plain red scarf in All Too Well: Short Film and the music video for the country single "I Bet You Think About Me"; in the film, Swift is seen hanging the scarf over a banister, whereas in the latter, she gifts the scarf to a bride, leaving the groom confused. Replicas of this scarf—named "The All Too Well Knit Scarf"—were sold on Swift's website.

Many celebrities have commented on the scarf; American singer and television host Dionne Warwick asserted on The Late Show With Stephen Colbert that the scarf should be returned to Swift. Canadian actor Simu Liu said the same in an interview and stated he is looking for the scarf. Speaking to Access Hollywood, South Korean boy group BTS said Swift does not need the scarf and that she has many better ones. American actor Andrew Burnap tweeted the scarf is in his possession; the authenticity of his claim has not been verified. In an interview at the 2022 Toronto International Film Festival, Swift described the red scarf as a metaphor, and that she made it a red-colored scarf to agree with the album's theme.

Personnel 
Credits are adapted from the liner notes of Red, and Red (Taylor's Version).

"All Too Well" (2012)
 Taylor Swift – vocals, songwriting, production
 Liz Rose – songwriting
 Nathan Chapman – production, acoustic guitar, electric guitar, bass, keyboards, drums, backing vocals, engineering
 LeAnn "Goddess" Bennet – production coordinator
 Drew Bollman – assistant mixer
 Jason Campbell – production coordinator
 Mike "Frog" Griffith – production coordinator
 Brian David Willis – assistant engineer
 Hank Williams – mastering
 Justin Niebank – mixing
"All Too Well (Taylor's Version)" (2021)
 Taylor Swift – lead vocals, songwriter, producer
 Liz Rose – songwriter
 Christopher Rowe – producer, vocal engineer
 David Payne – recording engineer
 Dan Burns – additional engineer
 Austin Brown – assistant engineer, assistant editor
 Bryce Bordone – engineer
 Derek Garten – engineer
 Şerban Ghenea – mixer
 Mike Meadows – acoustic guitar, background vocals
 Amos Heller – bass guitar, synth bass
 Matt Billingslea – drums
 Paul Sidoti – electric guitar
 David Cook – piano
 Max Bernstein – synthesizers

"All Too Well (10 Minute Version) (Taylor's Version) (from the Vault)" (2021)

 Taylor Swift – lead vocals, songwriter, producer
 Liz Rose – songwriter
 Jack Antonoff – producer, recording engineer, engineer, acoustic guitar, bass, electric guitar, keyboards, mellotron, slide guitar, drums, percussion
 Lauren Marquez – assistant recording engineer
 John Rooney – assistant recording engineer
 Jon Sher – assistant recording engineer
 David Hart – engineer, recording engineer: celesta, Hammond B3, piano, reed organ, baritone guitar, Wurlitzer electric piano
 Mikey Freedom Hart – engineer, celesta, Hammond B3, piano, reed organ, baritone guitar, Wurlitzer electric piano
 Sean Hutchinson – engineer, drums, percussion, recording engineer (percussion, drums)
 Jon Gautier – engineer, recording engineer (strings)
 Christopher Rowe – vocal engineer
 Laura Sisk – engineer, recording engineer
 Evan Smith – flutes, saxophone, synthesizers, recording engineer (flutes, saxophone, synthesizers)
 Bryce Bordone – engineer
 Michael Riddleberger – engineer, percussion
 John Rooney – engineer
 Şerban Ghenea – mixer
 Bobby Hawk – strings

Notes

References

External links 
 Lyrics of this song at Taylor Swift's official site

2012 songs
Taylor Swift songs
Songs written by Taylor Swift
Songs written by Liz Rose
2010s ballads
American soft rock songs
Country rock songs
American power pop songs
Rock ballads
Country ballads
Songs about heartache
Songs about nostalgia
Song recordings produced by Taylor Swift
Song recordings produced by Nathan Chapman (record producer)
Song recordings produced by Jack Antonoff
Song recordings produced by Chris Rowe
Songs containing the I–V-vi-IV progression
Billboard Hot 100 number-one singles
Billboard Global 200 number-one singles
Billboard Global Excl. U.S. number-one singles
Canadian Hot 100 number-one singles
Irish Singles Chart number-one singles
Number-one singles in Australia
Number-one singles in Malaysia
Number-one singles in New Zealand
Number-one singles in Singapore
2021 songs
2020s ballads